The Sapporo Symphony Orchestra (札幌交響楽団 Sapporo Kokyo Gakudan) is a Japanese orchestra based in Sapporo, Japan.  Colloquially known as "Sakkyo", this is the only professional orchestra in Hokkaido.  The orchestra gives its concerts at the Sapporo Concert Hall.

The orchestra was founded in 1961 as the Sapporo Citizen Symphony, with Masao Araya as its first principal conductor, and gave its first subscription concert that same year.  The next year, the orchestra renamed itself the Sapporo Symphony Orchestra.  Araya served as principal conductor of the orchestra until 1968.  In 1975, the orchestra toured to the USA and to West Germany.  In 2007, the orchestra celebrated its 500th subscription concert.  In October 2009, the orchestra was re-organised itself as a public interest incorporated foundation.  The orchestra toured Europe for its 50th anniversary celebrations.

Tadaaki Otaka was chief conductor of the orchestra from 1981 to 1986, then music advisor and principal conductor from 1998 to 2004, and then music director from 2005 to 2015.  Otaka now has the title of honorary music director of the orchestra.  Radomil Eliška served as principal guest conductor from 2008 to 2015, and now has the title of honorary conductor.  The orchestra's current principal guest conductor is Junichi Hirokami, since April 2017.  Other former chief conductors have included Max Pommer (2015–2018).

The orchestra's current chief conductor is Matthias Bamert, as of the 2018–2019 season.  His initial contract is for three years.

Conductors
 Masao Araya (Principal Conductor, 1961–1968)
 Peter Schwarz (Principal Conductor, 1967–1975)
 Hiroyuki Iwaki (Principal Conductor, then Music Director, 1975–1987; Conductor Laureate, 1988–2006)
 Kazuyoshi Akiyama (Music Advisor, later Principal Conductor; 1988–1998)
 Tadaaki Otaka (Chief Conductor, 1981–1986; Music Advisor and Principal Conductor, 1998–2004; Music Director, 2005–2015; Honorary Music Director, 2015–present)
 Max Pommer (Chief Conductor, 2015–2018)
 Matthias Bamert (Chief Conductor, 2018–present)

References

External links
 Official website of the Sapporo Symphony Orchestra

Japanese orchestras
Musical groups established in 1961
Organizations based in Sapporo
Musical groups from Hokkaido
1961 establishments in Japan